Narsingdi Sadar is an upazila of Narsingdi District in the Division of Dhaka, Bangladesh.

Geography

Demographics
As of the 1991 Bangladesh census, Narsingdi Sadar has a population of 451335. Males constitute ~53% of the population, and females ~47%. This Upazila's eighteen up population is 226885. Narsingdi Sadar has an average literacy rate of 31% (7+ years), and the national average of 32.4% literate.

Administration
Narsingdi Sadar Upazila is divided into two municipalities and 14 union parishads. The municipalities are: Madhabdi Municipality, Narsingdi Municipality; and the union parishads are: Alokbali, Amdia, Char Dighaldi, Chinishpur, Hajipur, Karimpur, Khathalia, Mahishasura, Meherpara, Nazarpur, Nuralapur, Paikarchar, Panchdona, and Silmandi. The union parishads are subdivided into 152 mauzas and 275 villages.

Madhabdi Municipality and Narsingdi Municipality are each subdivided into 9 wards.

The current Upazila Nirbahi Officer (UNO) of Narsingdi Sadar as of 15 March 2022 is Md. Mehedi Morshed.

Madhabdi is located in Narsingdi Sadar upazila, Narsingdi district, Bangladesh. The Baburhat market of Madhabdi Pourashava (municipal corporation) is one of the most famous trade centers in Bangladesh for various kind of cloths. There are many textile mills and textile-related industries situated here.

Education

There are 27 colleges in the upazila, most located in Narsingdi town. Those inside the town include: Narsingdi Govt. College, Narsingdi Science College, Narsingdi Independent College, Narsingdi Govt. Mohila College, Abdul Kadir Mollah City College, Baburhat Green Field College, Farida Hashem International College, Jaj Bhuiyan College, Madhabdi College, Madhabdi Digital College, Narsingdi Central College, Narsingdi Imperial College, Narsingdi Prime College, Narsingdi Udayon College, Scholastica Model College, and Shilmandi Adarsha College.

Notable secondary schools of the town include Brahmondi K.K.M Govt High School (1946), NKM High School and Homes (2008), Satirpara K.K. Institution School & College (1901), Narsingdi Govt. Girl's High School (1934), Balapur Nabin Chandra High School (1905), and Sir K.G Gupta High School (1919).

See also
Upazilas of Bangladesh
Districts of Bangladesh
Divisions of Bangladesh

References

Upazilas of Narsingdi District